Three ships of the Royal Navy have borne the name HMS Mary Grace:

  was a ship purchased in 1468 and listed until 1480.
  was a hoy captured in 1522 and listed until 1525.
  was a storeship captured in 1560 and listed until 1562.

See also
 

Royal Navy ship names